A bouffant is a type of puffy, rounded hairstyle characterized by hair raised high on the head and usually covering the ears or hanging down on the sides.

Etymology
The English word bouffant comes from the French bouffante, from the present participle of bouffer: "to puff, puff out".

History

The modern bouffant, considered by one source to have been invented by British celebrity hairdresser Raymond Bessone was noted by Life in the summer of 1956 as being "already a common sight in fashion magazines."

The style became popular at the beginning of the 1960s when First Lady Jacqueline Kennedy was often photographed with her hair in a bouffant, and her style was widely imitated. Generally speaking, by the mid-1960s, many well-dressed women and girls were wearing some form of bouffant hairdo, which in one variation or another remained the fashionable norm until supplanted by the geometric bob cut at the end of the decade and the looser shag or feathered styles of the early 1970s.

Middle-aged women who dressed conservatively clung to the style a little longer, while their teenaged daughters, imitating the look of popular folk-rock singers such as Joan Baez, Mary Travers, and Cher, began abandoning bouffants in favor of long, straight "ironed hair" as early as 1965.

Method
Hair on the top of the head was often raised by backcombing or "teasing" it with a comb to create a pile of tangled, loosely knotted hair on the top and upper sides of the head. Then, unteased hair from the front of the head was lightly combed over the pile to give a smooth, sleek look, and the ends of the outer hair might be combed, cut, curled, or flipped in many distinctive ways.

In some cases, a small wiglet or a cushion of nylon mesh might be used instead of or in addition to teasing, to add height at the crown of the head. Bangs might be worn over the forehead, or a long switch or "fall" of artificial hair, matching the wearer's own hair color, might be added at the back.

Usually, hair spray or hair lacquer was applied as a finishing touch to stiffen the hairdo and hold it in place without the need for hairpins. Since the hair could not be brushed without ruining the style, adjustments were made by using the long, pointed end of a "rattail" comb to gently lift the hair back into place.

See also
 List of hairstyles
 Pompadour (hairstyle)
 Beehive (hairstyle)
 Big hair

References

External links
 
 Hairstyle archives
 "Beauty and the Bouffant" gallery
 

Hairstyles
1960s fashion